The Pahonia Regiment is a group of Belarusian opposition volunteers, which was formed to defend Ukraine against the 2022 Russian invasion.

History 
On March 30, 2022, political activist Vadzim Prakopieu announced the beginning of the formation of the Belarusian Pahonia Regiment as part of the International Legion of Territorial Defence of Ukraine. On March 31, 2022, Belarusian opposition leader Sviatlana Tsikhanouskaya announced the unit's formation via social media.

The regiment was created on the initiative of Belarusian officers, many of whom had served already in the Pahonia detachment during the War in Donbas (2014–2022). Its recruiting center is located in Warsaw.

In June 2022, it became known that the first group of fighters of the Pahonia Regiment signed contracts with the Special Operations Forces of Ukraine. In the same month, "Pahonia" became known as "special purpose regiment". The regiment's fighters are trained by American Matthew Parker, one of the instructors of the International Legion of Territorial Defence of Ukraine.

On September 14, 2022, Vadzim Prakopieu, one of the founders of the regiment and assistant commander, left the regiment.

In October 25, 2022, it became known that the air reconnaissance team of the Pursuit Regiment had transferred to the Kastuś Kalinoŭski Regiment, another unit of Belarusian volunteers fighting for Ukraine.

On October 28, 2022, the Ministry of Internal Affairs of Belarus recognized the Pahonia Regiment as an "extremist formation". They are among the list of 625 persons to be deemed as extremists.

In November 2022, fighters of the Pahonia Regiment, together with Belarusians permanently living in Ukraine, founded the public association "Pahonia". Kickboxer Vitaly Gurkov became its director.

In November 2022, the European Parliament adopted a resolution expressing its support for the Pahonia Regiment.

Losses 
On September 26, 2022, in the Battle of Bakhmut in the Donetsk region, Alyaksei Veshchavaylau, a fighter of the Pahonia Regiment was killed.

Notes

References

External links 
 Official Telegram channel of the Pahonia Regiment
 Official Facebook page of the Pahonia Regiment

Regiments of the International Legion of Territorial Defense of Ukraine
Foreign volunteer units resisting the 2022 Russian invasion of Ukraine
Military units and formations established in 2022
Military units and formations of Ukraine in the war in Donbas
Territorial defence battalions of Ukraine
Resistance during the 2022 Russian invasion of Ukraine
Belarus in the 2022 Russian invasion of Ukraine
Belarus–Ukraine relations
Military units and formations of the 2022 Russian invasion of Ukraine